Isabel Pearl Dawson (October 13, 1917 – April 9, 1982) was a political figure in British Columbia, Canada. She represented Mackenzie in the Legislative Assembly of British Columbia from 1966 to 1972 as a Social Credit member.

She was born Isabel Pearl Saunders in Camrose, Alberta, the daughter of John David Saunders, and was educated there and in Princeton, British Columbia and Vancouver. She served in the Canadian Women's Army Corps during World War II. She married Charles John Dawson. Dawson served in the provincial cabinet as a minister without portfolio. She was defeated by Don Lockstead when she ran for reelection to the provincial assembly in 1972. After leaving politics, Dawson earned a degree in psychology from the University of Victoria and an MSc in gerontology from the University of Oregon. In 1974, she moved to Victoria from Powell River. Dawson died of cancer at the age of 64.

The Isabel Dawson building at Camosun College is named in her honour.

References 

1917 births
1982 deaths
British Columbia Social Credit Party MLAs
Canadian Military Engineers
Women government ministers of Canada
Canadian women in World War II
Deaths from cancer in British Columbia
Canadian gerontologists
Members of the Executive Council of British Columbia
People from Camrose, Alberta
University of Oregon alumni
University of Victoria alumni
Canadian female military personnel
Women MLAs in British Columbia
20th-century Canadian politicians
20th-century Canadian women politicians